Lake Saint Catherine or Lake St. Catherine may refer to:

Lake St. Catherine (Louisiana)
Lake Saint Catherine (Vermont)